Oaxaca is a compilation album by American jazz pianist Vince Guaraldi released by D & D Records (Guaraldi's briefly resurrected label) in 2004. The album is a mix of previously unreleased studio and live recordings taped in 1970 and 1971.

Background
In the mid-2000s, Vince Guaraldi's son, David Guaraldi, worked with audio archivist Michael Graves at his Atlanta, Georgia-based Osiris Studio, in an effort to restore a wealth of unreleased recorded material from his father's archives. The recordings on Oaxaca come from a variety of sources: some songs were performed live at In Your Ear, a jazz club based in Palo Alto, California; one is performed at The Matrix in San Francisco, with remaining tracks taped at Golden State Recorders in San Francisco.

The release features covers of The Rolling Stones' "You Can't Always Get What You Want" and The Beatles' "Something" and "You Never Give Me Your Money", both from Abbey Road.

Oaxaca was released on CD only. It did not receive a vinyl release.

Critical reception
All About Jazz critic David Rickert commented that Oaxaca "could be called In A Silent Way, Charlie Brown," adding that Guaraldi is "powered by a rhythm section well versed in providing a driving rock beat. Armed with an arsenal of electronic devices, they turn 'You Can't Always Get What You Want' into a ferocious squall, yet display a gentler touch on 'Something.' It's a testament to Guaraldi's abilities as a musician that all this works as well as it does, and his treatments of these relatively new songs show a skill at interpretation that was never quite apparent in his early days as a pianist dealing with standards." Rickert concluded by saying, "it should come as no surprise that Guaraldi is still capable of crafting amazingly catchy melodies, and the title track is one of his finest."

Derrick Bang, Guaraldi historian and author of Vince Guaraldi at the Piano, described the title track as "a catchy little tune full of sparkle and sass, which sounds like it could have been a Peanuts theme."

Track listing

Personnel
Credits adapted from CD liner notes.
Vince Guaraldi Quartet
Vince Guaraldi – piano, Fender Rhodes, Hammond B-3, clavinet
Vince Denham – saxophone, flute
Koji Kataoka – electric bass
Mike Clark – drums

Additional
 Derrick Bang – liner notes 
 David Guaraldi – producer
 Michael Graves – engineer (audio restoration), producer

References

External links

2004 compilation albums
2004 live albums
Albums arranged by Vince Guaraldi
Vince Guaraldi compilation albums
Cool jazz compilation albums
Mainstream jazz compilation albums
Peanuts music
Vince Guaraldi albums
Vince Guaraldi live albums
Live cool jazz albums
Live mainstream jazz albums